Sri Lanka competed at the 2018 Commonwealth Games in the Gold Coast, Australia from April 4 to April 15, 2018.

The Sri Lankan team consists of 139 members, including 80 athletes competing in 13 sports (15 disciplines). However, Sumesh Wickramasinghe did not compete in athletics. The country made its Commonwealth Games debut in the discipline of rhythmic gymnastics and Canadian born Anna-Marie Ondaatje became the first gymnast to represent Sri Lanka at the Commonwealth Games. The team also consists of 38 officials.

Weightlifter Chinthana Vidanage was the country's flag bearer during the opening ceremony.

With six medals won, this edition of the games represented the most successful games for the country in terms of overall medals.

Medalists

Competitors
The following is the list of number of competitors participating at the Games per sport/discipline.

Athletics (track and field)

Sri Lanka received a quota of 14 athletes (eight men and six women). However, only 12 athletes were entered, with sprinter Rumeshika Rathnayake being added to the team later to make the total team size 13 (eight male and five female). However only 12 participated as Sumesh Wickramasinghe did not compete in the men's 4 × 100 m relay.

Men
Track & road events

Field events

Women
Track & road events

Field events

Badminton

Sri Lanka participated with eight athletes (four men and four women).

Singles

Doubles

Mixed team

Roster

Hasini Ambalangodage
Madushika Beruwelage
Sachin Dias
Buwaneka Goonethilleka
Thilini Hendahewa
Dinuka Karunaratna
Niluka Karunaratne
Kavidi Sirimannage

Pool A

Beach volleyball

Sri Lanka qualified a men's beach volleyball team for a total of two athletes.

Boxing

Sri Lanka participated with a team of 6 athletes (3 men and 3 women). Anusha Koddithuwakku became the first Sri Lankan female boxer to secure a Commonwealth Games medal and also created history for becoming the first Sri Lankan female boxer to qualify for the semi-final round at a Commonwealth Games competition.

Cycling

Sri Lanka's cycling team consisted of two athletes.

Road
Men

Diving

Sri Lanka participated with a team of 2 divers (1 man and 1 woman).

Gymnastics

Artistic
Sri Lanka participated with 3 athletes (3 women).

Women
Team Final & Individual Qualification

Rhythmic
Sri Lanka participated with 1 athlete (1 woman), marking its debut appearance in the discipline.

Individual Qualification

Individual Finals

Rugby sevens

Men's tournament

Sri Lanka qualified a men's rugby sevens team of 12 athletes, by being the highest ranked Commonwealth nation at the 2017 Asia Rugby Sevens Series.

Roster
The roster was officially named on March 30, 2018.

Sudarshana Muthuthanthri
Danushka Ranjan
Richard Dharmapala
Srinath Sooriyabandara
Danush Dayan
Hirantha Perera
Tarinda Ratwatte
Rehan Silva
Sudam Sooriyarachchi
Naveen Henakankanamage
Adeesha Weeratunga
Kavindu Perera

Pool D

Shooting

Sri Lanka participated with 3 athletes (2 men and 1 woman).

Squash

Sri Lanka participated in the squash competition with one male and one female athlete.

Swimming

Sri Lanka's swimming team consisted of six athletes (four men and two women).

Men

Women

Table tennis

Sri Lanka participated with 6 athletes (3 men and 3 women).

Singles

Doubles

Team

Weightlifting

Sri Lanka competed in weightlifting. The Sri Lankan weightlifting team consisted of 11 athletes (seven men and four women).

Men

Women

Wrestling

Sri Lanka participated with 3 athletes (2 men and 1 woman).

Men

Women

See also
Sri Lanka at the 2018 Asian Games
Sri Lanka at the 2018 Summer Youth Olympics

References

Nations at the 2018 Commonwealth Games
Sri Lanka at the Commonwealth Games
2018 in Sri Lankan sport